Like Mike 2: Streetball is a 2006 American sports comedy film directed by David Nelson.  The film does not feature any of the original cast members nor are there any mentions of the previous film's events.

Plot

Jerome Jenkins Jr. and his friends are very adept at streetball, but are no match for the older boys in their neighborhood. When the friends realize a streetball team called Game On is coming to town to look for talent, they practice extremely hard and work to win.

After one of his short visits, Jerome is shooting some hoops and notices a pair of shoes hanging up by a streetlight. Jerome retrieves the shoes, which are soon afterward hit by lightning, giving their wearer the ability to play like Michael Jordan.

At the Game On talent game, Jerome gets a chance to take a half-court shot and to play one-on-one with another streetballer. His new shoes allow him to win easily, leading the Game On coach to give Jerome a spot on the team. However, many people try to steal his glory. Jerome's lazy and conniving supposed cousin Ray quickly claims to be Jerome's agent, and starts signing Jerome up with sponsors and otherwise making sure he has Jerome under his thumb.

During the first Game On game with Jerome, the team is struggling until Jerome gets in the game; they come back and win with his help. That night the guys go out to a club, but Jerome can not go because he is not old enough. So he goes to an amusement park with his friends, where they give him the streetball name Triple J.

Under Ray's encouragement, Jerome becomes a ball hog. He fights with his friends, and his teammates start giving him the cold shoulder.

While on break from the team, Jerome goes home on the day his father is also returning. Ray wants Jerome's mother to sign a contract that would let Ray get 15% of what Jerome makes. Ray also books Jerome in a music video. They say that they will be back before his father gets back. In Jerome's clip, his father comes out of nowhere and takes him away. They get in a fight about what Jerome is doing, with Jerome disregarding his father's advice.

Before the last game of the season, Ray urges Jerome to wear some shoes made by sponsors, but Jerome refuses, knowing his magic sneakers are what give him his ability to play. They go up against the Drop Squad, the best team in the league. Jerome's teammate, known as Ghost in the Machine, is worried because his father is in the crowd and this will be the first time Ghost's father has seen him play since high school. When they go out to play the Drop Squad, Ghost is at first outplayed. Jerome starts helping out Ghost and they come back at the half. During halftime, when Jerome is not looking, Ray swaps his magic shoes with the sponsor shoes he wanted Jerome to wear. Jerome suddenly starts playing worse and they lose. Angrily, Jerome says that he quits the team.

Outside Jerome has a talk with Ray, who reveals the extent of his power over Jerome. After Ray drives away, Jerome takes the bus home. Having lost his two best friends and Ray having hoodwinked him with a shady contract, Jerome tells his mother he's quit basketball. The next day, Jerome's mother kicks Ray out of the house, for his hateful schemes against her and Jerome. Then Jerome goes to the court and apologizes to his friends. They say they will see him at the King Of The Concrete Championships, but he tells them that he does not have the magic shoes anymore and that he has quit basketball. One of his friends says that Jerome should just play for fun. After giving his friends some pointers, Jerome realizes they really should play again. They form a team called Triple Threat. Jerome also finds the magic shoes in Ray's stuff.

The next day at the King Of The Concrete Championship, Ray has a new team called Ray On, composed of players which Jerome had shown up on other occasions. Triple Threat makes it into the finals thanks to Jerome, but so does Ray On. When Ray On goes up against Triple Threat, Ray deliberately messes up Jerome's sneakers and Nathan gets hurt. Then Jerome's father leads them back at the final shot. Jerome shoots the last shot without his magic shoes and it goes in.

After the game, more sponsors ask if they can sponsor Jerome, but his father refuses. Then Ray tries to pull out the contract that he ripped up, when Dalton locks Ray in his trunk. Then Jerome walks home with his family. Ray then screams from the trunk, which ends up getting towed, and Jerome's shoes are hung up on a street light.

Cast

 Jascha Washington as Jerome "Triple J" Jenkins, Jr.
 Michael Beach as Jerome "Double J" Jenkins, Sr.
 Kel Mitchell as Ray Thomkins
 Brett Kelly as Rodney Rheingold
 Micah Williams as Nathan Daniels
 Blu Mankuma as Coach Archie
 Michael Adamthwaite as Dalton "Miracle Whip"
 Moneca Delain as Lexi Lopez
 Enuka Okuma as Lydia Jenkins
 Mohammed Wenn as Raindrop
 Jonathan Mubanda as the Ghost in the Machine
 Joel Haywood as Cavity
 Viv Leacock as Preacher
 Adrian Holmes as Buck Wild
 Shay Kuebler and Graham Wardle as the Bullies
 Richard O'Sullivan as Baller
 Rob Morton as Hank
 Enid-Raye Adams as the KOTC Woman at the Desk
 Jason Emanuel as SureFire Marketing Rep
 Daniel Bacon and Leslie Hopps as the Trend Executives
 Josh Masters as Seven Footer
 Louis Johnson as Flex
 Clyde Drexler as the KOTC Announcer
 Christopher Lovick as the KOTC Ref
 Juanita Mirehouse and Jennifer Cheon Garcia as the Fly Girls
 Tom Pickett as the Hotel Guest
 Donny Lucas as Chauffeur
 Shaw Madson as A.D.
 David Mubanda as the Arena Opponent
 Brad Mann and Todd Mann as the Suits
 Dagmar Midcap as the TV Announcer
 Nathaniel DeVeaux as the Ghost's Father
 Brenda Crichlow as the Woman at the Desk
 Mark Cuban as the Drop Squad Coach
 Doug Abrahams as the Arena Ref
 James Whyte as the City Opponent

Cameos
Former NBA player Clyde Drexler and Dallas Mavericks NBA team owner Mark Cuban both made cameos in this film, Drexler as himself and Cuban as a team's coach.

References

External links
 
 

2006 films
2006 direct-to-video films
2000s sports films
20th Century Fox direct-to-video films
American basketball films
American sequel films
American children's comedy films
Direct-to-video sequel films
Films scored by Stanley Clarke
Streetball
2006 directorial debut films
2000s English-language films
2000s American films